Autumn Mood is an album by McCoy Tyner that was released by Laserlight in 1997. It was recorded in February 1991 and features performances by Tyner with Avery Sharpe, Aaron Scott, Raphael Cruz, and Claudio Roditi recorded for LRC. The album combines two tracks which appeared on Blue Bossa with three performances first released on an LRC album with other tracks by Roland Hanna. The Allmusic review by Scott Yanow calls the album "A good but not essential outing".

Track listing 
All compositions by McCoy Tyner except where indicated

 "The Natural Bridge" (Claudio Roditi) – 8:17  
 "Traces" – 8:33  
 "The Monster and the Flower" (Roditi, Ricardo Silveira) – 7:00  
 "Up, Jump, Spring" (Freddie Hubbard) – 7:19  
 "Autumn Mood" (Roditi) – 6:25

Personnel 
 McCoy Tyner: piano
 Claudio Roditi:  trumpet, flugelhorn
 Avery Sharpe: bass
 Aaron Scott: drums
 Raphael Cruz: percussion

References 

McCoy Tyner albums
1997 albums